Ivana Monti (born 20 February 1947) is an Italian stage, television and film actress.

Life and career 
Born in  Milan, Monti studied at the drama school of the Piccolo Teatro in her hometown, and made her professional debut in 1966 in the  stage play I giganti della montagna directed by Giorgio Strehler. He also directed her in King Lear (1972)  and in The Trial of Lucullus (1973).  

Monti was mainly active on television, in TV-movies and series. She also appeared in a number of films, mainly cast in supporting roles. 

Monti was married to journalist Andrea Barbato until his death in 1996.

Filmography

References

External links  
 

1947 births
Living people 
Actresses from Milan
Italian film actresses
Italian stage actresses
Italian television actresses
20th-century Italian actresses